The 1919 SAFL Grand Final was an Australian rules football competition.  drew with  5.9 (39) to 5.9 (39). This was the second time in the competition's history that a Grand Final had been drawn, and the most recent. Sturt won the Grand Final Replay a week later, 3.5 (23) to 2.6 (18).

1919 SAFA Premiership Football Match

1919 SAFL Premiership Football Match Replay

References

SANFL Grand Finals
1919 SAFL Grand Final